Taiyuan Daily, also known as Taiyuan Ribao, is a simplified Chinese newspaper published in the People's Republic of China. The newspaper is the organ newspaper of the Taiyuan Municipal Committee of the Chinese Communist Party, and its predecessor was Shanxi Political Newspaper (山西政报), inaugurated in Taiyuan in 1913, sponsored by the then Shanxi Gazette Office (山西公报馆).

In 1949, with the founding of the People's Republic of China, Taiyuan Daily is sponsored by the Taiyuan Municipal Committee of the CCP, and was re-launched on January 1, 1952.

References

Newspapers published in Asia
Newspapers established in 1913
Daily newspapers published in China
Chinese-language newspapers (Simplified Chinese)